Chantelouve is a former commune in the Isère department in southeastern France. On 1 January 2019, it was merged into the new commune Chantepérier.

Population

See also
Communes of the Isère department

References

Former communes of Isère